Gramavision Records is an American record label founded in 1979. Since 1994 it has been a subsidiary of Rykodisc. The label's music is largely jazz, blues and folk oriented but has touched on many other styles and genres. 

In 1979, Jonathan F.P. Rose founded Gramavision in Katonah, New York. The early catalog consisted of free jazz by Ray Anderson, John Carter, Anthony Davis, and Bobby Previte; jazz fusion by John Scofield; funk by Medeski Martin & Wood; reggae by Oliver Lake; and soul by Jamaaladeen Tacuma. 

After it was bought by Rykodisc, the label's headquarters moved to Salem, Massachusetts. in 1995, Gramavision released albums by Peter Apfelbaum, Bill Frisell, Ron Miles, and the Clusone Trio.

Roster
 
 Ray Anderson
 Peter Apfelbaum
 Arditti Quartet
 Gordon Beck
 John Blake Jr.
 Vinicius Cantuária
 John Carter
 Philip Catherine
 Clusone Trio
 Anthony Davis
 Electronic Art Ensemble
 Pee Wee Ellis
 Christian Escoudé
 Aydin Esen
 Bill Frisell
 Paul Halley
 Steven Halpern
 Billy Hart
 Motohiko Hino
 Jay Hoggard
 Allan Holdsworth
 The J.B.'s
 Kitaro
 Kronos Quartet
 Oliver Lake
 Pete Levin
 Arto Lindsay
 Didier Lockwood
 Al MacDowell
 Taj Mahal
 Harry Manfredini
 John Medeski
 Medeski Martin & Wood
 Myra Melford
 Ron Miles
 Tom Mkhize
 Bob Moses
 James Newton
 Jimmy Payne
 Bobby Previte
 Cornell Rochester
 John Scofield
 Klaus Schulze
 Ralph Simon
 Harvie Swartz
 Oranj Symphonette
 Jamaaladeen Tacuma
 Bob Telson
 Kazumi Watanabe
 Bernie Worrell
 Robert Wyatt
 Yas-Kaz
 La Monte Young

References

Further reading
 P. Verna. "Rhino to Distribute Gramavision Titles: Deal Kicks in as Jazz Label's Mesa Contract Expires", Billboard, 104 (25 July 1992), p. 10
 J. McAdams: "Gramavision Quietly Cranks out Collectibles: Label's Release Slate a Tribute to R&B, Funk, Jazz", Billboard, 105 (3 April 1993), p. 25
 C. Morris. "Gramavision to Rejoin Indie Ranks with Ryko", Billboard, 106 (20 Aug 1994), p. 76
 C. Morris. "Rykodisc Readies 1st Gramavision Catalog Releases", Billboard, 106 (3 Sept 1994), p. 12

Jazz record labels
American record labels